SCS Software s.r.o. is a Czech video game development company based in Prague, Czech Republic. It primarily produces simulation games for Microsoft Windows, macOS, and Linux, including the 18 Wheels of Steel and Truck Simulator series.

Games

Bus Driver 
SCS released a bus driving simulator, Bus Driver, in 2007. Later in 2014, an iOS version of Bus Driver was released, entitled Bus Driver – Pocket Edition.

18 Wheels of Steel 

The 18 Wheels of Steel series primarily focuses on North America. The series was published by ValuSoft from 2002, with Hard Truck: 18 Wheels of Steel, to 2011, with 18 Wheels of Steel: Extreme Trucker 2.

Truck Simulator 

The Truck Simulator series includes Euro Truck Simulator, published in 2008, its sequel game, Euro Truck Simulator 2, which was released in 2012. Both games focus on truck/lorry driving in European countries, such as the United Kingdom, Germany, the Czech Republic, Luxembourg, Italy, France, Belgium, the Netherlands, Austria, and Switzerland. SCS Software has released a number of maps as downloadable content (DLC) for Euro Truck Simulator 2 . The first DLC, "Going East!" was released in late 2013, and includes a number of Eastern European countries; adding Hungary and expanding on Slovakia and Poland. A further map expansion for Scandinavia; including Denmark, Norway and Sweden; was released on 6 May 2015. The update also included licensed Mercedes-Benz trademarks and branding. Further map DLCs included "Vive la France" on 5 December 2016 expanding further into France, and "Italia" on 5 December 2017 adding to the game's coverage of Italy. Released on 29 November 2018, "Beyond the Baltic Sea" expanded across Latvia, Lithuania, Estonia, and parts of Russia and Finland, and "Road to the Black Sea" added Romania, Bulgaria, and the Thrace region of Turkey on 5 December 2019. "Iberia", released 8 April 2021, added Spain and Portugal. Future plans as of 2023 include "West Balkans" and "Heart of Russia" DLCs, although the latter has been delayed indefinitely due to concerns over the 2022 Russian invasion of Ukraine.

Following the success of the Euro Truck Simulator series, SCS announced that the next game in the series would be American Truck Simulator, released 3 February 2016. However, it released early on 2 February 2016. The game currently covers the entire western U.S. states in the lower 48, including part of the south central regions of California, Nevada, Arizona, New Mexico, Oregon, Washington, Utah, Idaho, Colorado, Wyoming, Montana and Texas. The game features officially licensed American conventional trucks; including models by Peterbilt, Kenworth, Volvo, International, Mack, Western Star, and Freightliner. The game originally released with California and Nevada, with the state of Arizona releasing as a free DLC to owners of the game in June 2016 and New Mexico releasing as paid DLC in November 2017. Almost a year later in October 2018, the state of Oregon was also released as a paid DLC. Then, on 11 June 2019, the state of Washington was added as paid DLC, with Utah releasing on 7 November 2019. The state of Idaho was released on 16 July 2020. The state of Colorado was released on 12 November 2020. Then the state of Wyoming was released on 7 September 2021. The state of Montana was next in line and was released on 4 August 2022 to mark the end of an era to the completion of the entire Western Region in the lower 48. Not long afterwards the biggest ever US state of Texas was released on 15 November 2022 and was one of the biggest ever projects to ever take on in the history books of any of the other DLC states that SCS Software have ever released. Future states and map add-ons (such as Oklahoma and Kansas) will be sold as paid DLC.

Games developed

References

External links 
 

 
Video game companies of the Czech Republic
Video game development companies
Video game companies established in 1997
Companies based in Prague
Czech companies established in 1997